Take You Higher is the first and only studio album by Australian funk band Dynamic Hepnotics, released in May 1985. Take You Higher peaked at number 30 on the Australian Kent Music Report.

Track listing 
Side One 

Side Two

Charts

References 

Dynamic Hepnotics albums
1985 albums
Mushroom Records albums